This article contains a list of tributaries of the Allegheny River, a stream in the U.S. states of New York and Pennsylvania. (Mouth at the Ohio River)

New York Sources:

Oswayo Creek (Portville, Cattaraugus Co., NY)
Dodge Creek (Allegany County NY)
Lillibridge Creek (Portville, Cattaraugus Co., NY)
Wayman Branch (Cattaraugus County NY)
Haskell Creek (Cattaraugus County NY)
Kings Brook (Cattaraugus County NY)
Olean Creek (Olean, Cattaraugus Co., NY)
Twomile Creek (south bank) (Cattaraugus County NY)
Twomile Creek (north bank) (Cattaraugus County NY)
Fourmile Creek (Cattaraugus County NY)
Fivemile Creek (Allegany, Cattaraugus Co., NY)
Birch Run (Cattaraugus County NY)
Ninemile Creek (Cattaraugus County NY)
Tenmile Creek (Cattaraugus County NY)
Chipmunk Creek (Cattaraugus County NY) (Elev. 1,371 ft.)
Tunungwant Creek (Cattaraugus County NY)
Carrollton Run (Cattaraugus County NY)
Leonard Run (Cattaraugus County NY)
Windfall Creek (Cattaraugus County NY)
Great Valley Creek (Salamanca, Cattaraugus Co., NY)
Titus Run (Cattaraugus County NY)
Little Valley Creek (Salamanca, Cattaraugus Co., NY)
Drakes Run (Cattaraugus County NY)
Sawmill Run (Cattaraugus County NY)
Breeds Run (Cattaraugus County NY)
Red House Lake (Allegany State Park, Cattaraugus County NY)
Red House Brook (Cattaraugus County NY)
Robinson Run (Cattaraugus County NY)
Cricks Run (Cattaraugus County NY)
Cold Spring Creek (Cattaraugus County NY)

In Pennsylvania ...

Pine Creek
Little Pine Creek (west bank)
Little Pine Creek (east bank)
Willow Run
Montour Run
North Fork Pine Creek
Crouse Run
Wexford Run
Squaw Run
Stony Camp Run
Glade Run
Plum Creek
Bodies Run
Little Plum Creek
Deer Creek
Little Deer Creek 
Long Run 
Rawlins Run 
Blue Run 
Cunningham Run 
Cedar Run 
Dawson Run 
West Branch Deer Creek 
Falling Springs Run
Blacks Run
Tawney Run
Yutes Run
Riddle Run
Pucketa Creek
Little Pucketa Creek
Crawford Run
Bailey Run
Days Run
 Girtys Run (Allegheny County, PA)
Bull Creek
Little Bull Creek
McDowell Run
Lardintown Run
Rocky Run
Chartiers Run
Rachel Carson Run
Buffalo Creek
Little Buffalo Creek
Sarver Run
Pine Run
Cornplanter Run
Sipes Run
Rough Run
North Branch Rough Run
Sarver Run
Marrowbone Run
Patterson Creek
Long Run
Little Buffalo Run
Kiskiminetas River
Elder Run
Brady Run
Guffy Run
Carnahan Run
Pine Run
Beaver Run
Roaring Run
Rattling Run
Flat Run
Wolford Run
Long Run
Blacklegs Creek
Big Run
Marshall Run
Harpers Run
Nesbit Run
Hooper Run
Whisky Run
Loyalhanna Creek
Getty Run
Serviceberry Run
Whitethorn Creek
Conemaugh River
Blacklick Creek
Two Lick Creek
Yellow Creek
Little Yellow Creek
Little Conemaugh River
Stonycreek River
Shade Creek
Clear Shade Creek
Dark Shade Creek
Big Run
Knapp Run
Hill Run
Watson Run
Taylor Run
Nicholson Run
Glade Run
Crooked Creek
Campbell Run
Elbow Run
Horney Camp Run
North Branch
Cherry Run
Fagley Run
Sugar Run
Lindsay Run
Craig Run
Plum Creek
Dutch Run
Cessna Run
South Branch
Mudlick Run
Sugarcamp Run
Leisure Run
Goose Run
North Branch
Walker Run
Anthony Run
Curry Run
Cheese Run
Mitchell Run
Dark Hollow Run
Fulton Run
McKee Run
Twomile Run
Pine Run
Brush Run
Rayne Run
Garretts Run
Rupp Run
Cowanshannock Creek
Mill Run
Spra Run
Huskins Run
South Branch Cowanshannock Creek
Spruce Run
Limestone Run
Hays Run
Pine Creek
North Fork Pine Creek
Bullock Run
South Fork Pine Creek
Deaver Run
Laurel Run
North Branch South Fork Pine Creek
South Branch South Fork Pine Creek
Mahoning Creek
Little Mahoning Creek
Redbank Creek
Little Sandy Creek
North Fork Creek
Sandy Lick Creek
Bear Creek
Silver Creek
South Branch Bear Creek
North Branch Bear Creek
Clarion River
Piney Creek
Mill Creek
Spring Creek
Little Toby Creek
Sandy Creek
East Sandy Creek
French Creek
Sugar Creek
Conneaut Outlet
Cussewago Creek
LeBoeuf Creek
Trout Run
Benson Run
East Branch LeBoeuf Creek
South Branch French Creek
Bentley Run
Pine Run
Hungry Run
Lilley Run
Beaver Run
Slaughter Run
Baskin Run
Spencer Creek
Twomile Run
Brannon Run
Charley Run
Oil Creek
Cornplanter Run
Calaboose Run
Cherry Run
Cherrytree Run
Wykle Run
Kane Run
Benninghof Run
Husband Run
Pine Creek
Caldwell Creek
Porky Run
Stony Hollow Run
Church Run
Thompson Creek
McLaughlin Creek
Shirley Run
Hummer Creek
Marsh Run
East Branch Oil Creek
Bloomfield Run
Mosey Run
East Shreve Run
West Shreve Run
Pithole Creek
Tionesta Creek
Brokenstraw Creek
Coffee Creek
Conewango Creek
Chadakoin River
Kinzua Creek
Cornplanter Run
Oswayo Creek
Potato Creek
Mill Creek
Steer Run
Baker Creek
Peet Brook
Dwight Creek
Woodcock Creek

See also
 List of rivers of New York
 List of rivers of Pennsylvania
 Tributaries of Redbank Creek

References

Sources
 

 
Allegheny River
Allegheny River
Allegheny